Zbigniew Kazimierz Lew-Starowicz (born 25 October 1943 in Sieradz) is a Polish psychiatrist and psychotherapist, expert in sexology and national consultant in this field, and professor of medical science.

He has been awarded the Knight's Cross (1997) and the Officer's Cross (2012) of the Order of Polonia Restituta.

References 

Polish sexologists
Polish psychiatrists
1943 births
Living people
People from Sieradz
Recipients of the Order of Polonia Restituta